Caloptilia scaeodesma is a moth of the family Gracillariidae. It is known from India (including the Andaman Islands) Indonesia (the Anambas Islands), Malaysia (Selangor), Sri Lanka and Vanuatu.

The larvae feed on Rhizophora and Sonneratia species. They mine the leaves of their host plant.

References

scaeodesma
Moths of Asia